Barison Peninsula is the mostly ice-covered peninsula projecting 19 km in northwest direction from Graham Coast in Graham Land, Antarctica.  It is 12 km wide between Beascochea Bay to the northeast and Leroux Bay to the southwest.  The area was possibly visited by the 1897–99 Belgian expedition under Adrien de Gerlache and the 1903–05 French expedition under Jean Charcot.

The peninsula was named by the 1973–74 Chilean Antarctic Expedition for Captain Eduardo Barison Roberts, commander of the expedition naval vessel Yelcho.

Location
The British mapped the peninsula in 1971 and 1976.

Maps
 British Antarctic Territory.  Scale 1:200000 topographic map. DOS 610 Series, Sheet W 65 64.  Directorate of Overseas Surveys, Tolworth, UK, 1971.
 British Antarctic Territory.  Scale 1:200000 topographic map. DOS 610 Series, Sheet W 65 62.  Directorate of Overseas Surveys, Tolworth, UK, 1976.

References
 SCAR Composite Gazetteer of Antarctica.

Peninsulas of Graham Land
Graham Coast